Mariwood Lake is a lake on Vancouver Island north east of Moat Lake on Forbidden Plateau, Strathcona Provincial Park,

See also
List of lakes of British Columbia

References

Alberni Valley
Lakes of Vancouver Island
Comox Land District